The 10th G7 Summit was held in London, England, United Kingdom from 7 to 9 June 1984. The venue for the summit meetings was Lancaster House in London.
 
The Group of Seven (G7) was an unofficial forum which brought together the heads of the richest industrialized countries: France, West Germany, Italy, Japan, the United Kingdom, the United States, Canada (since 1976), and the President of the European Commission (starting officially in 1981). The summits were not meant to be linked formally with wider international institutions; and in fact, a mild rebellion against the stiff formality of other international meetings was a part of the genesis of cooperation between France's president Valéry Giscard d'Estaing and West Germany's chancellor Helmut Schmidt as they conceived the first Group of Six (G6) summit in 1975.

Leaders at the summit

The G7 is an unofficial annual forum for the leaders of Canada, the European Commission, France, Germany, Italy, Japan, the United Kingdom and the United States.
   
The 10th G7 summit was the first summit for Italian Prime Minister Bettino Craxi. It was also the last summit for Canadian Prime Minister Pierre Trudeau.

Participants
These summit participants are the current "core members" of the international forum:

Issues
The summit was intended as a venue for resolving differences among its members. As a practical matter, the summit was also conceived as an opportunity for its members to give each other mutual encouragement in the face of difficult economic decisions. Issues which were discussed at this summit included:
 economic problems, prospects, and opportunities for countries and for the world
 world recession
 enduring growth and the creation of new jobs
 growing strain of public expenditure
 unemployment
 political and economic challenges for developing countries
 debt burdens of developing countries and role for the International Monetary Fund (IMF)
 policies to reduce inflation and interest rates
 control monetary growth and reduce budgetary deficits
 business innovations
 labour issues and opportunities
 economic stability and management
 development assistance and assistance through the international financial and development institutions to the developing countries
 third world debt
 trade liberalization
 poverty and drought
 oil and the Persian Gulf
 the Eastern Bloc
 job creation innovations in Italy
 the environment
 manned space stations

Gallery

See also
 G8

Notes

References
 Bayne, Nicholas and Robert D. Putnam. (2000).  Hanging in There: The G7 and G8 Summit in Maturity and Renewal. Aldershot, Hampshire, England: Ashgate Publishing. ; OCLC 43186692 (Archived 2009-04-29)
 Reinalda, Bob and Bertjan Verbeek. (1998).  Autonomous Policy Making by International Organizations. London: Routledge.  ; ;

External links
 No official website is created for any G7 summit prior to 1995 -- see the 21st G7 summit.
 University of Toronto: G8 Research Group, G8 Information Centre
  G7 1984, delegations & documents

1980s in the City of Westminster
G7 summit
1984 in international relations
G7 summit 1984
G7 summit
G7 summit 1984
G7 summit 1984
Events in London
1984
June 1984 events in the United Kingdom